Atiqur Rehman is an Uttar Pradesh politician and member of Indian National Congress. He represented  Nagina (Assembly constituency)  4th and 5th Legislative Assembly of Uttar Pradesh, serving from March 1967 to March 1974.

References 

Living people
Indian National Congress politicians from Uttar Pradesh
People from Bijnor district
Uttar Pradesh politicians
Year of birth missing (living people)